New College Durham is a further and higher education college and a sixth form college in County Durham, England. It was founded in 1977 as a result of a merger between Neville's Cross College of Education and Durham Technical College.

Until 2004, the college operated on two main sites near the city of Durham: Neville's Cross and Framwellgate Moor. The site at Framwellgate Moor opened in 1957 and was extended in 1970; the site housed the bulk of the college's further education (FE) provision, whilst the Neville's Cross site, an ex-college of education site built in the 1920s, housed most of the higher education (HE) provision. In 2002, the college was given planning permission to build a new £37 million campus at Framwellgate Moor. Construction work began in 2003 with the new buildings being constructed around the old buildings. When the new buildings were completed, work began to demolish the old site at Neville's Cross. The construction work was completed in September 2005, whilst the landscaping was finally completed in October.

In the academic year 1999–2000, the college enrolled 8,270 FE students, of whom 1,877 were full-time, and 1,934 HE students, of whom 675 were full-time. Business and management was offered on the Neville's Cross Campus until 2004.
In 2011, the College became one of only two in the country to be granted Foundation Degree Awarding Powers. These can be converted to bachelor's degrees via a "top up" year, with the degrees validated by Teesside University, Sunderland University and Leeds Metropolitan University.

Notable alumni
 David Anderson, Labour Member of Parliament for Blaydon (2005–2017), Shadow Secretary of State for Northern Ireland and Shadow Secretary of State for Scotland (2016–2017) (Durham Technical College)
John Cummings, Labour Member of Parliament for Easington (1987–2010) (Durham Technical College)
Stephen Hughes, Labour Member of the European Parliament for Durham and then North East England (1984–2014)
Ian Lavery Labour Member of Parliament for Wansbeck and Chairman of the Labour Party

References

External links

New Logo
New College Durham adopted a new refined logo which resembled the old one. The new logo was uploaded to their social media (Instagram and Facebook) on 21/10/2020 9:00. The logo was voted for on an online survey which was sent to students and staff in the college.

Buildings and structures in Durham, England
Further education colleges in County Durham
Educational institutions established in 1977
1977 establishments in England
Sixth form colleges in County Durham